"Their Way" is the debut single by indie rock group Littl'ans. It was released in October 2005 and reached number 22 in the UK Singles Chart.  The band were touring with Babyshambles at the time the song was recorded and their lead singer Pete Doherty liked the song so much he asked it he could sing on the track. He also appeared in the video with the band.

Track listing
"Their Way" (Littl'ans featuring Pete Doherty)
"The Other Way"
"Did You Hide From Saturday Night?"
"Their Way" (Video)

2005 debut singles
Littl'ans songs
Pete Doherty songs
2005 songs
Rough Trade Records singles
Songs written by Pete Doherty